Melys (English translation:"Sweet") are a Welsh independent rock band from Betws-y-Coed in Conwy, formed in 1996.  They sing in both English and Welsh. They have recorded eleven sessions for John Peel on BBC Radio 1, came first in his Festive Fifty in 2001 and won Best Welsh-language Act at the Welsh Music Awards in 2002.

History and line-up 
The group was formed by Andrea Parker (vocals) and Paul Adams (guitar and keyboards) when the two met in Betws-y-Coed in 1996. The two became both musical and personal partners and recruited Adams' brother Gary Husband on drums and their friend Carys Jones on keyboards.

After releasing two EP's with local label Ankstmusik the group was signed to Pinnacle Records releasing their first album Rumours and Curses in 1998. Unfortunately their relations with Pinnacle, always strained, fell apart completely when that label went bankrupt at the end of the year. The group subsequently founded their own label, Sylem Records, on which their second album Kamikaze was released. Jones left the band at around this time to be replaced by Richard Eardley who continues as bassist with them to this day.

John Peel, a long-time fan of the group (and for whom they recorded 11 Peel Sessions) introduced the group to Dutch band Seedling in late 2000 and they released a split single in collaboration with them (the song on Seedling's side was called "Cool Baby My Hips Go Woo") in early 2001.

Suikerspin (Dutch for candy floss), Melys' third album, was released in 2001. They scored some considerable success when a single from this album called "Chinese Whispers" was voted number one in Peel's Festive Fifty at the end of the year.

After this success Melys apparently shied away from the public eye, returning in 2003 with their fourth album Casting Pearls.  Their latest release was Life's Too Short (a title (and album) dedicated to Peel) in 2005. At least one song on every album is in the Welsh language, for which the group do not provide an English translation, either in the printed lyrics or on their website.

The band had a four-year break from releasing records and playing gigs after a March 2005 gig in Llandudno; Parker and Adams opened a restaurant called Bistro Betws-y-Coed in their hometown, specialising in Welsh food. In September 2009 the band played a gig for "John Peel Day" at Hendre Hall in Bangor in memory of the DJ.
In the summer of 2016, Melys performed at 'By the edge of the Sea' festival with The Wedding Present in Brighton and at the Stowed Out festival in Stow near Edinburgh. They toured with the Wedding present in December 2016 and released a Peel Sessions album and new EP in 2017 to celebrate their 20th anniversary.

Discography (albums and EPs)
Fragile EP (1996)
Cuckoo EP (1997)
Rumours and Curses (1998)
Diwifr EP (1998)
Lemming EP (1998)
Ambulance Chaser EP (1998)
Baby Tornado EP (1999)
Slagging Off Tourists EP (1999)
Kamikaze (2000)
Un Darllenwr Lwcus EP (2000)
I Don't Believe in You 7-inch EP (2001)
Chinese Whispers EP (2001)
Suikerspin compilation (2001)
So Good EP (2002)
Casting Pearls (2003)
Eyeliner EP (2004)
Life's Too Short (2005)

References

External links
Melys biography from BBC Wales

Welsh-language bands
Welsh indie rock groups
British indie pop groups
Musical groups established in 1996